Past Minutes (Portuguese: Minutos Atrás) is a 2013 Brazilian comedy-fantasy film directed and written by Caio Sóh.

Plot
Nildo (Otávio Muller) and Alonso (Vladimir Brichta) are two waste pickers, whose lonely souls wander through life behind remains of dreams and fears played out in search of a reason for their lives. Along with the Ruminant horse (Paulo Moska), their companion, the two share fantastic and surreal stories that sometimes borders on insanity. They walk towards the construction of a new destination to its existence, distressed by the passage of time.

Cast
Vladimir Brichta as Alonso
Paulo Moska as Ruminant
Otávio Muller as Nildo

References

External links
   
 

Brazilian fantasy comedy films
2010s fantasy comedy films
2013 comedy films
2013 films
2010s Portuguese-language films